Arlene McQuade (May 29, 1936 – April 21, 2014) was an American television, radio and theater actress best known for her portrayal of Rosalie on the CBS series, The Goldbergs.

McQuade died at a nursing home in Santa Fe, New Mexico, on April 21, 2014, aged 77, after a long battle with Parkinson's disease. She had been the first wife of actor, Valentin de Vargas (died 2013) whom she met on the set of Touch of Evil.

Filmography

|1960|| “ HAVE GUN, WILL TRAVEL “ || Princess Aouda

References

External links

1936 births
2014 deaths
Actresses from New York City
American television actresses
American film actresses
American radio actresses
Deaths from Parkinson's disease
Neurological disease deaths in New Mexico
21st-century American women